Aclytia conjecturalis is a moth of the family Erebidae. It was described by Max Wilhelm Karl Draudt in 1930. It is found in Brazil.

References

Moths described in 1930
Aclytia
Moths of South America